The Beda dam is a dam in Saudi Arabia opened in 1985 and located in Al Baha region.

See also 

 List of dams in Saudi Arabia

References 

Dams in Saudi Arabia